Muhammad Safdar Awan (Hindko and ; born 19 January 1964) is a Pakistani politician and retired Pakistan Army officer who had been a member of the National Assembly of Pakistan from June 2008 to May 2018.

He is married to the PMLN supremo Nawaz Sharif's daughter Maryam Nawaz.

Early and personal life
According to PILDAT, Awan was born on 19 January 1963. According to the News International and Dawn, he was born on 19 January 1964.

He joined Pakistan Army after completing his early education.

Awan married  Maryam Nawaz in 1992 while he was serving as captain in Pakistan Army and had been the ADC to Nawaz Sharif during the latter's tenure as Prime Minister of Pakistan. After retiring from Pakistan Army as captain he joined the civil services, and was posted as Lahore Model Town assistant commissioner.

Political career

Safdar joined politics after returning to Pakistan in 2007 along with the Sharif family.

Awan was elected to the National Assembly  as a candidate of Pakistan Muslim League (N) (PML-N) from Constituency NA-52 (Rawalpindi-III) in by-election held in June 2008. He received 54,917 votes and defeated a candidate of Pakistan Muslim League (Q). The seat was vacated by Nisar Ali Khan.

In 2011, Awan was made the chief organiser of the PML-N Youth Wing.

In 2012, Awan was suspended from PML-N for verbally abusing leaders of PML-N.

Awan was re-elected to the National Assembly as a candidate of PML-N from Constituency NA-21 (Mansehra-cum-Tor Ghar) in 2013 Pakistani general election. He received 91,013 votes and a candidate of Jamiat Ulema-e-Islam (F).

In May 2016, Awan was reported to Election Commission of Pakistan (ECP) by Imran Khan for concealing Maryam Nawaz assets. Safdar denied that however was summoned by ECP in June 2016.

In June 2018, he was allocated PML-N ticket to contest the 2018 general election from Constituency NA-14 (Mansehra-cum-Torghar).

In July 2018, he was sentenced to one-year jail term in Avenfield corruption reference filed by the National Accountability Bureau. As a result, he was disqualified from contesting election for 10 years. The next day, he arrived in Rawalpindi and surrendered to authorities. In September 2018,  He was released on bail over Avenfield corruption charges.

On 19 October 2020, Capt. Safdar was arrested from Karachi hotel for 'violating sanctity of Quaid's mausoleum' and was released on bail the same day.

Political views
In 2012, Awan publicly supported Islamic fundamentalist Mumtaz Qadri who assassinated former Governor of Punjab Salmaan Taseer for speaking against the blasphemy law.

He has often been involved in spreading hatred against the persecuted Ahmadiyya Muslim community in Pakistan and called for a ban on hiring Ahmadis in the armed forces and other important institutions of the country. He has been criticized for his statements against a vulnerable minority and using it for political gains.

See also 
 Maryam Nawaz

References

Living people
1963 births
Pakistan Army officers
Pakistani MNAs 2008–2013
Pakistani MNAs 2013–2018
Pakistani prisoners and detainees
Pakistani expatriates in Saudi Arabia
Pakistani Muslims
Pakistan Muslim League (N) MNAs
Sharif family
Critics of Ahmadiyya
Pakistani politicians convicted of crimes